Life Is Better Blonde is an Australian Electronic, Indie group from Melbourne, Australia.

At the J Awards of 2015, the group won Australian Music Video of the Year for "Mine".

Discography

Extended plays

Singles

Awards and nominations

J Award
The J Awards are an annual series of Australian music awards that were established by the Australian Broadcasting Corporation's youth-focused radio station Triple J. They commenced in 2005.

|-
| J Awards of 2015
| "Mine"
| Australian Video of the Year
|

References

Australian indie pop groups
Musical groups established in 2015
Musical groups from Melbourne
2015 establishments in Australia